Bazitamak (Baźıtamaq) is a rural locality (a selo) and the administrative centre of Bazitamaksky Selsoviet, Ilishevsky District, Bashkortostan, Russia. The population was 666 as of 2010. There are 5 streets.

Geography 
Bazitamak is located 40 km northeast of Verkhneyarkeyevo (the district's administrative centre) by road. Staronadyrovo is the nearest rural locality.

References 

Rural localities in Ilishevsky District